The Tarascan Plateau (Spanish: Meseta Tarasca), also Purépecha Plateau (Meseta Purépecha), is a plateau and region in the Mexican state of Michoacán, in Southwestern Mexico.

The plateau begins at the southwestern foot of the Trans-Mexican volcanic belt. 

It is considered a region of temperate land, irrigated by the Lerma River and its tributaries. 

It has several lakes, like Lake Pátzcuaro, Lake Cuitzeo, and Lake Zirahuén.

History
The Tarascan Plateau has a strong indigenous peoples presence. The Purépecha were dedicated to agriculture and forestry. 

It was the location of the Purépecha culture during the Mesoamerican Postclassical period. Some of its principal pre-Columbian and present day population centers were/are Pátzcuaro and Tzintzuntzan.

See also

Plateaus of Mexico
Landforms of Michoacán
Geography of Mesoamerica
Purépecha